Gozarkhani, or Alamuti, is a moribund Northwestern Iranian language closely related to Talysh.

Northwestern Iranian languages